Saeed Al-Harbi is a Saudi Arabian football player who plays for Al-Zulfi as a goalkeeper.

Career statistics

Club

References

External links

slstat.com Profile

1982 births
Living people
Saudi Arabian footballers
Al-Shabab FC (Riyadh) players
Al-Hazem F.C. players
Al-Shoulla FC players
Bisha FC players
Al-Zulfi FC players
Saudi First Division League players
Saudi Professional League players
Saudi Second Division players
Association football goalkeepers